"Certain Things Are Likely" is a song by English band Kissing the Pink, released as both a 7" and 12" single from their album of the same name. Produced by the band and Peter Walsh, "Certain Things Are Likely" was released as the third single from the album, and was the most successful of their three entries on Billboard's Dance Club Songs chart, peaking at No. 1 for three weeks. The song also made the Billboard Hot 100, peaking at No. 97.

Track listing
7" single
"Certain Things Are Likely (Remix Edit)"
"Certain Things Are Likely (Garage Edit)"

12" single
"Certain Things Are Likely (Garage)"
"Certain Things Are Likely (Garage Dub)"
"Certain Things Are Likely (Original Mix)"
"Certain Things Are Likely (Instrumental)"

Chart performance

In film
 "Certain Things Are Likely" can be heard in the 1987 film, Can't Buy Me Love.
 Too Beautiful to Die (Nothing Underneath 2),  (1988)

See also
 List of number-one dance singles of 1987 (U.S.)

References

External links
 

Kissing the Pink songs
1987 singles
1986 songs